The Serbian Association for Practical Shooting, Serbian Savez za praktično streljaštvo Srbije (SPSS), is the Serbian association for practical shooting under the International Practical Shooting Confederation.

External links 
 Official homepage of SPSS

References 

Regions of the International Practical Shooting Confederation
Practical Shooting